Frederick is a stop on the Region of Waterloo's Ion rapid transit system. It is located in the median of Frederick Street, just east of King Street, in downtown Kitchener. It opened in 2019.

The station's feature wall consists of solid green glass tiles; this mimics the coloration of the exterior of Market Square.

The primary access to the platform is from the crosswalk at King Street; a secondary access at the north end of the platform, crossing the southbound lanes of Frederick Street, is marked as an emergency exit only.

Destinations served include the Market Square shopping and office complex, the regional courthouse, and TheMuseum. To the north of the station is the proposed 'Duke Tower Kitchener' condominium development. Across King, at Benton, is a Grand River Transit customer service office.

References

External links

 

Ion light rail stations
Railway stations in Kitchener, Ontario
2019 establishments in Ontario